Delta Air Lines Flight 1581 was a scheduled flight from Dallas/Fort Worth International Airport to George Bush Intercontinental Airport. On January 7, 1992, the Boeing 737-200 operating this flight lost its right engine on takeoff. The pilots were able to land the plane safely back at the airport.

Aircraft 
The aircraft involved was a Boeing 737-200. The aircraft made its first flight on May 9th, 1984 and was delivered to Delta Air Lines on August 10th of that same year.

Accident 
The Boeing 737-200 took off from Dallas/Fort Worth International Airport at 1:30 PM CST.  As the aircraft lifted off the ground, the right engine fell from the wing. The flight immediately returned to the airport landing around 12 minutes later.

References 

Accidents and incidents involving the Boeing 737 Original
Aviation accidents and incidents in 1992
1992 in the United States
1992 in Texas
January 1992 events in the United States
Aviation accidents and incidents in the United States in 1992
Airliner accidents and incidents caused by maintenance errors
Airliner accidents and incidents involving in-flight engine separations